Percy Goodison was an English professional association footballer who played as an inside forward.

Goodison was signed by Football League Second Division club Burnley in 1911. He played just one league game for the Clarets before he transferred to nearby Accrington Stanley a year later.

References

Year of birth unknown
Footballers from Burnley
English footballers
Association football forwards
Burnley F.C. players
Accrington Stanley F.C. (1891) players
English Football League players